Charles Henry Martin (August 28, 1848 – April 19, 1931) was a United States representative from North Carolina. Martin was born near Youngsville, Franklin County, N.C., on August 28, 1848. He attended the common schools and the preparatory department of Wake Forest College, graduating from Wake Forest in 1872 and from the University of Virginia at Charlottesville in 1875. He later studied at the Southern Baptist Theological Seminary in Louisville, Kentucky.

Martin worked as a principal of the high schools at Badin and Lumberton, North Carolina, and was a professor of Latin at a female college at Murfreesboro, North Carolina, and later taught at Wake Forest College. He was admitted to the bar in 1879, practicing law in Louisburg and later in Raleigh. Martin was ordained as a Baptist minister in 1887.

Martin moved to Polkton, North Carolina, after marrying Mary Williams, who was from that area. There, he ran against Democrat James A. Lockhart for Congress (6th District) as a Populist in 1894. After Lockhart was at first declared the winner, Martin successfully contested the election and was seated by the House during the Fifty-fourth Congress. He was reelected to the Fifty-fifth Congress and served from June 5, 1896, to March 3, 1899. Martin did not seek renomination in 1898 and resumed his ministerial duties at Polkton, where he died on April 19, 1931.

His great-grandfather was Nathaniel Macon.

References

1848 births
1931 deaths
People from Youngsville, North Carolina
Baptists from North Carolina
People's Party members of the United States House of Representatives from North Carolina
North Carolina lawyers
North Carolina Populists
Southern Baptist Theological Seminary alumni
University of Virginia alumni
Wake Forest University alumni
Wake Forest University faculty
People from Polkton, North Carolina
Members of the United States House of Representatives from North Carolina